Thomas Moseley may refer to:

Thomas William Moseley, builder and designer of wrought-iron arch bridges
Thomas Moseley (MP), member of the Parliament of England